Giorgios Chatziioannidis (30 November 1960 – 22 July 2012) was a Greek professional footballer who played as striker.

Club career
Chatziioannidis started football from playing from a young age at Aetos Skydra. In 1978, the youth team of AEK Athens, as the champion of the southern group in the amateur championship, competed in Trikala against PAOK, the champion of the northern group, to win the league title. The team got the victory and with it the title and then moved to Skydra for a friendly match with the local team so that the people of the club can check Chatziioannidis who was then playing there.
The tall forward left an excellent impression and in the summer of 1978 he transferred to AEK. He began to compete with the youth team of the club with which he won the championship by defeating the youth team of Panathinaikos in the final. In the meantime, František Fadrhonc who has in charge of the infrastructure departments of AEK prepared a group of players, including Chatziioannidis, who signed a professional contract in the summer of 1979 and join the men's team.

Although he performed very well scoring in the friendly matches of the summer of 1979, he did not manage to establish himself in the attacking line of the team, which at that time included the "stars" of Thomas Mavros and Dušan Bajević. Thus, he was loaned to the PAS Giannina in 1980 to have more games on his feet. He returned to AEK the following summer, having had a good year with the team from Ioannina, but he again failed to establish himself after, among other things, he ran into Mojaš Radonjić, who had been acquired as a replacement for Bajević. With the "yellow-blacks" he won the Greek Cup in 1983. He left the club in the summer of 1984.

After football
After the end of his football career he served as deputy mayor of Skydra. He died on 22 July 2012, at the age of 51, after a long-term health problem.

Honours

AEK Athens 
Greek Cup: 1982–83

References

1960 births
2012 deaths
Greek footballers
Super League Greece players
AEK Athens F.C. players
PAS Giannina F.C. players
Association football forwards
People from Skydra